The 2017 FIBA 3x3 World Tour is the 6th season of the FIBA 3x3 World Tour, the highest professional 3x3 basketball competition in the World. The tournament is organized by FIBA.

The World Tour Final was held in Beijing, China at the Bloomage Live Hi-Up shopping mall.

Finals qualification
Seven Masters tournaments will be held in seven different cities in seven different countries. The FIBA 3x3 World Tour Final are scheduled to be held in Beijing, China from October 21-22.

Group stage

Group A

Group B

Group C

Group D

References

External links 
Official website

 
FIBA 3x3 World Tour seasons
World Tour